AMASS or amass may refer to:

AMASS, or Autonomous Mobile Acoustic Submarine Simulator, supplied by QinetiQ
Airport Movement Area Safety System